Bonjigawa Dam is a gravity dam located in Yamagata Prefecture in Japan. The dam is used for power production. The catchment area of the dam is 244.8 km2. The dam impounds about 9  ha of land when full and can store 1274 thousand cubic meters of water. The construction of the dam was started on 1932 and completed in 1933.

References

Dams in Yamagata Prefecture
1933 establishments in Japan